The AVCA Showcase, established by the American Volleyball Coaches Association, was an annual NCAA volleyball tournament that was held at the start of each fall season. In the old format, four teams, usually ranked in the top 15, compete for the showcase title. In the new format, it was changed to a conference challenge.
 
The tournament was founded in 1995, and ten times, the showcase champion has made the NCAA Women's Volleyball Championship final four, with the team winning the national championship twice.

Prior to 2005, it was called the "State Farm/NACWAA Classic". At the start of 2008, Runza Restaurants started sponsoring, thus the name becoming "Runza/AVCA Showcase".

History
As of 2007, the showcase champion went on to the NCAA Final Four 10 times out of 13. The only time the winner failed to advance to the Final Four was Colorado State in 2000, Texas in 2006 and Nebraska in 2007. However, only twice has the showcase champion won the NCAA Championship: Long Beach State in 1998 and Southern California in 2003. Ironically, those two schools both had undefeated records en route to the NCAA title. The only other school to go undefeated in the NCAA era (since 1981) was Nebraska in 2000.

The following table lists the past winners, runners-up, city the tournament is hosted in, and the Most Valuable Player.

Old format
Prior to 2008, the showcase was done with four teams, with the winners of the first match playing for the championship and the losers playing for third place in the consolation match.

New format
In 2008, the AVCA announced that the showcase would take on a new format. Instead of four teams competing in a tradition 1st–4th place tournament, it would be two teams from an athletic conference taking on two teams from another athletic conference. The two teams from the same conference do not play each other. The tournament was held in Omaha, Nebraska at the Qwest Center through 2010, and was known as Rockvale Outlets/AVCA Showcase and was held at Penn State in 2011.

Other teams
The following is a list of teams that participated, but never won or finished as runners-up in the tournament.

External links
Showcase history

Volleyball competitions in the United States